Robert Ernest "Rhoda" McDonald (29 April 1878 – 4 December 1937) was an Australian rules footballer who played with Collingwood and Carlton in the Victorian Football League (VFL).

Notes

External links 

Rhoda McDonald's profile at Blueseum
 

1878 births
Australian rules footballers from Victoria (Australia)
Collingwood Football Club players
Carlton Football Club players
Richmond Football Club (VFA) players
South Adelaide Football Club players
1937 deaths